Year 1274 (MCCLXXIV) was a common year starting on Monday (link will display the full calendar) of the Julian calendar.

Events 
 By place 

 Europe 
 May 7 – Second Council of Lyon: Pope Gregory X convenes a council at Lyon, after Emperor Michael VIII (Palaiologos) gives assurances that the Orthodox Church is prepared to reunite with Rome. The council agrees to a settlement between the Catholic Church and the Orthodox Church over several key issues – Orthodox acceptance of papal primacy and the acceptance of the Nicene Creed with the Filioque clause. Gregory approves a tithe to support efforts to liberate the Holy Land from Muslims, and reaches apparent resolution of the schism, which ultimately proves unsuccessful. All but four mendicant orders of friars are suppressed. Catholic teaching on Purgatory is defined for the first time.
 November – The Imperial Diet at Nuremberg orders that all crown estates seized since the death of Emperor Frederick II be restored to King Rudolf I. Almost all European rulers agree, with the exception of Ottokar II, king of Bohemia, who has benefited greatly by conquering or otherwise coming into possession of many of those lands.

 England 
 August 2 – Prince Edward (the Lord Edward) finally returns from the Holy Land, to be crowned king of England, two years after his father King Henry III's death, on August 19.
 September 21 – Walter de Merton, English chancellor and regent, retires from royal service, in favour of Robert Burnell, who becomes a strong ally of the Edwardian regime.
 The first main survey of the Hundred Rolls, an English census seen as a follow-up to the Domesday Book (completed in 1086), is begun; it lasts until 1275.

 Africa 
 Abu Yusuf Yaqub ibn Abd al-Haqq, Marinid ruler, enters peacefully into Ceuta, putting an end to some 40 years of the city's independence.

 Asia 
 November 4–19 – Battle of Bun'ei: Forces of the Mongol-led Yuan Dynasty of China invade Japan. After conquering the Japanese settlements on Tsushima and Iki islands, Kublai Khan's fleet moves on to Japan and lands at Hakata Bay. Their landing is not unopposed: an old sea wall ran along much of the bay and behind it are stationed the warriors of Hōjō Tokimune. The Japanese open combat with whistling arrows (kabura-ya), designed to unnerve and intimidate their foes. The Mongols use bombs against the Japanese forces and manage to break through at a few places, burning down the nearby town of Hakata (modern-day Fukuoka). The invaders are eventually repelled, and after inflicting heavy losses on the Japanese, a withdrawal is ordered. Credit for a great typhoon – called a kamikaze, or divine wind – the Mongol fleet is dashed on the rocks and destroyed. Some sources suggest that 200 warships are lost. Of the 30,000 strong invasion force, some 13,000 does not return.
 Nichiren, Japanese priest and philosopher, enters exile on Mount Minobu. He leads a widespread movement of followers in Kantō and Sado mainly through his prolific letter-writing.

 By topic 

 Literature 
 Bonvesin da la Riva, Italian poet, writes the didactic-allegoric poem Liber di Tre Scricciur ("Book of the Three Scriptures"). The text is in the Western Lombard language (similar to other Gallo-Italic languages). The poem is one of the first great literary works in Italy. It tells about Hell, the Passion of Jesus and Paradise; the plot later prefigures Dante Alighieri in his Divine Comedy (or La Divina Commedia).
 May 1 – In Florence, the 9-year-old Dante first sees the 8-year-old Beatrice, his lifelong muse. She appears later as one of his guides in the Divine Comedy, Paradiso and Purgatorio.

 Religion 
 Pope Gregory X decrees that conclaves (gatherings of the College of Cardinals where the elections of a bishop of Rome are convened) should be used for papal elections, reforming the electoral process which had taken over 3 years to elect him.
 Gregory X obtains the region of Romagna from Rudolf I, in exchange for acknowledging him as Holy Roman Emperor. With this important acquisition, the Papal States become the second-largest power block in Italy after the Kingdom of Sicily.

Births 
 February 9 – Louis of Toulouse, French archbishop (d. 1297)
 July 11 – Robert I (the Bruce), king of Scotland (d. 1329)
 July 25 – John Beauchamp, English nobleman (d. 1336)
 October 4 – Rudolf I, German nobleman (d. 1319)
 November 24 – Catherine I, Latin empress (d. 1307)
 Adam Murimuth, English priest and chronicler (d. 1347)
 Al-Dhahabi, Syrian scholar and encyclopedist  (d. 1348)
 Anastasia de Montfort, Italian noblewoman (d. 1345)
 Eric VI, king of Denmark (House of Estridsen) (d. 1319)
 Ibn al-Jayyab, Andalusian scholar and poet (d. 1349)
 Marino Faliero (or Falier), doge of Venice (d. 1355)
 Nasiruddin Chiragh Dehlavi, Indian Sufi poet (d. 1337)
 Rizzardo IV, Italian nobleman and military leader (d. 1312)
 Robert Clifford, English nobleman and knight (d. 1314)
 Sancho I (the Peaceful), king of Majorca (d. 1324)
 Seisetsu Shōchō, Chinese missionary (d. 1339)

Deaths 
 February 18 – Jakob Erlandsen, Danish cleric and archbishop
 February 19 – Lal Shahbaz Qalandar, Afghan Sufi poet (b. 1177)
 February 21 – Ibn Malik, Moorish grammarian and writer (b. 1205)
 March 7 – Thomas Aquinas, Italian friar and theologian (b. 1225)
 April 26 – Heinrich von Wartenberg, Swiss nobleman and abbot
 June 3 – Lawrence of St. Martin, English archdeacon and bishop
 June 26 – Nasir al-Din al-Tusi, Persian scientist and writer (b. 1201)
 July 15 – Bonaventure, Italian theologian and philosopher (b. 1221)
 July 22 – Henry I (or Henry III), king of Navarre (House of Blois) 
 July 23 – Wonjong of Goryeo, Korean prince and ruler (b. 1219)
 August 4 – Robert Stitchill (or Stichel), English prior and bishop
 August 12 – Du Zong (or Zhao Qi), Chinese emperor (b. 1240)
 August 15 – Robert de Sorbon, French chaplain and theologian
 September 2 – Munetaka, Japanese prince and shogun (b. 1242)
 October 14 – Henry, English prince and son of Edward I (b. 1268)
 November 4 – Sō Sukekuni, Japanese governor (jitodai) (b. 1207)
 November 8 – Fujiwara no Akiuji, Japanese nobleman (b. 1207)
 November 10 – Aveline de Forz, English noblewoman (b. 1259)
 November 28 – Philip of Castile, son of Ferdinand III (b. 1231)
 Arnold Fitz Thedmar, English merchant and chronicler (b. 1201)
 Beatrice of Montferrat, Italian noblewoman and regent (b. 1210)
 Gilbert of Preston, English nobleman and chief justice (b. 1209)
 Henry I Kőszegi (the Great), Hungarian nobleman (b. 1210)
 Liu Bingzhong, Chinese court advisor and architect (b. 1216)
 Sadr al-Din al-Qunawi, Seljuk philosopher and writer (b. 1207)
 William of Douglas (Longleg), Scottish nobleman (b. 1220)

In Fiction 
The video-game Ghost of Tsushima is set in the year 1274.

References